The Republican Party of Kentucky is the affiliate of the Republican Party in Kentucky and follows its nationally established platform. The party's headquarters is in Frankfort, Kentucky.

The party gained relevance around the 1940s. Since this emergence, the party did poorly in state executive office elections until 2015 but saw some success on the federal level and in the Kentucky General Assembly. The party is organized into two main committees that hold authority. In the 2015 Kentucky elections, the party captured the offices of Governor, Lieutenant Governor, Treasurer, and Auditor, gaining the majority of the state executive offices for the first time in modern history.  In 2016, Republicans gained control of the state house for the first time since 1920. It is currently the dominant party in the state, controlling all but one of Kentucky's six U.S. House seats, both U.S. Senate seats, and supermajorities in both houses of the state legislature. The only two statewide offices that the party does not currently control are the governorship and the lieutenant governorship, which are currently held by Democrats Andy Beshear and Jacqueline Coleman respectively.

History

Emergence and relevancy
After the times of the Solid South, Kentucky has a unique Republican history. Although it is a traditionally Democratic State, the Republican Party of Kentucky became more relevant in Kentucky political affairs around the 1940s and 1950s.  Although candidates in presidential and congressional races began to fare well and see success in elections around this time, it did not translate to much success on the state and local levels. Despite receiving measurable numbers of votes and being competitive in elections, many of the candidates for gubernatorial and legislative races consistently failed to get elected into office.

Struggles
Despite becoming consistently competitive in state elections, the party's strength in the 1970s and 1980s were comparable to that of the 1930s and 1940s.  Between the time of the emergence of the Republican Party of Kentucky and the 1980s, the only Republican governor elected to office was Louie B. Nunn in 1967. This is considered one of the few high points for the party. Problems within the party organization contributed greatly to these struggles. Part of it is due to the turnover at the state party chairman position throughout the 1970s, which hindered any consistency and progress within the party organization. While in the 1980s, however, much of the difficulties for the party came from trying to get good candidates to run for office. For example, in the four state elections held between 1979 and 1987, Republicans only contested 53 out of the 100 State House of Representative seats and only 11 of the 19 State Senate seats.

Party organization
The Republican Party of Kentucky is organized based on three levels of authority. The top authority comes from the registered Republicans in Kentucky when the State Convention is in session. However, since the convention is often out of session, there are two lower levels of main authority. The Republican State Central Committee (RSCC) has full control of party operations when State Convention is not in session, while the executive committee within the RSCC controls operations when the RSCC is not in session.

Republican State Central Committee
The Republican Party of Kentucky's main authority when not assembled in State Convention is the Republican State Central Committee. The RSCC is responsible for a number of activities and operations involving the party on the state and local levels and is required to meet twice per year through established rules. Some of the operations include controlling of funds, creating committees, and promoting campaigns on all levels. The RSCC meets within twenty days of the Republican State Convention to elect certain officers, while some other officers in turn are appointed by the elected officers. For example, the State Chairman is elected by the RSCC, who in turn appoints a Treasurer of his or her choosing.

Executive committee
While the RSCC is not in session, the responsibilities for party organization are delegated to the executive committee, which consists of 56 members and is required through established rules to meet four times a year. Most of the power in the executive committee resides in six high-ranking members, which are the State Chairman, Vice Chairman, Secretary, Treasurer, National Committeewoman, and National Committeeman.

Current officers
 Mac Brown, State Chairman
 DeAnna Brangers, Vice Chairman
 John Mocker, Secretary
 Cathy Bell, Treasurer
 KC Crosbie, National Committeewoman
 Robert M. Duncan, National Committeeman

Current elected officials
The Kentucky Republican Party controls five of the seven statewide offices and holds a majority in the Kentucky Senate. Republicans also hold both of the state's U.S. Senate seats and five of the six U.S. House seats. This did not change in the recent state office elections of 2011, as James Comer won the Agriculture Commissioner seat, while the Democrats won all the others.

Members of U.S. Congress

U.S. Senate
Republicans have controlled both of Kentucky's seats in the U.S. Senate since 1998:

U.S. House of Representatives
Out of the 6 seats Kentucky is apportioned in the U.S. House of Representatives, 5 are held by Republicans:

Statewide office
Republicans control five of the seven elected statewide offices:
Attorney General: Daniel Cameron
Auditor: Mike Harmon
State Treasurer: Allison Ball
Agriculture Commissioner: Ryan Quarles
Secretary of State: Michael Adams

Kentucky General Assembly
Senate President: Robert Stivers
Senate President Pro Tempore: David P. Givens
Senate Majority Leader: Damon Thayer
Speaker of the House: David Osborne
House Speaker Pro Tempore: David Meade
House Majority Leader: John "Bam" Carney

Place in Kentucky General Assembly
The Republican Party of Kentucky holds supermajorities in both chambers of the Kentucky General Assembly. They currently hold 30 of the 38 seats in the Kentucky Senate, while holding 75 out of 100 seats in the Kentucky House of Representatives.

Recent events and initiatives

Dewayne Bunch resignation
In April 2011, recently elected 82nd District State Representative Dewayne Bunch was severely injured at the school that he worked at. He was knocked unconscious while trying to break up a fight between two students. With the accident causing severe trauma and requiring a long recovery process, Bunch was forced to resign. Bunch's resignation was announced by his wife and recognized by Republican Floor Leader Jeff Hoover on October 26, 2011 in a public press release.

Recently sponsored passed legislation
Effective June 1, 2011, five specific pieces of legislation sponsored by the Kentucky Republican Caucus were passed in the state of Kentucky. These bills reflect many of the beliefs of the Republican Party of Kentucky on a handful of issues, which include education, gun control, and veteran affairs.
In regards to education, House Bill 92, which was sponsored by Republican Representative Adam Koenig, is a law that requires high schools throughout Kentucky to provide seniors with more voter information. In addition, House Bill 464, which was sponsored by Republican Representative David Osborne, provides the Kentucky Board of Education with stricter rules in dealing with errors in textbooks. 
Along with laws influencing practices in education, a law that expands the concealed carry policies was also sponsored by the Kentucky Republican Caucus and put into law in 2011. Republican Representative Alicia Webb-Edgington sponsored House Bill 313, which allows loaded or unloaded firearms to be stored in any original compartments of the owners vehicle.

References

External links
Republican Party of Kentucky
Kentucky Federation of College Republicans

Politics of Kentucky
Kentucky
Political parties in Kentucky